Marie-Sophie Nélisse (born March 27, 2000) is a Canadian actress. She is known for her Genie Award–winning performance in Monsieur Lazhar, as Liesel Meminger in the film adaptation of the best-selling novel The Book Thief, written by Markus Zusak, and as Caroline in The Kid Detective. She also stars as young Shauna in Showtime's series Yellowjackets.

Early life

Marie-Sophie Nélisse was born in Windsor, Ontario, on March 27, 2000. She is of French descent. Her mother, Pauline Belhumeur, left her job as a schoolteacher in 2013 to act as a talent manager for both Sophie and her younger sister Isabelle, who is also an actress. Nélisse is fluent in both French and English. The family moved to Montreal when she was four.

Career 
She spent her early years training in gymnastics, aiming for the 2016 Olympics, and signed to a talent agency to make money to pay for the training, but after getting the part in The Book Thief (and subsequent accolades) she shifted her focus to acting. Additionally, Nélisse formed and still maintains a close friendship with her co-star from The Book Thief, Nico Liersch.

Besides her Genie Award for Monsieur Lazhar, she won a Jutra Award for her performance and a Young Artist Award nomination as Best Leading Young Actress in an International Feature Film. She held a recurring role the Québec sitcom  and she also starred in the title role of the 2015 film The Great Gilly Hopkins. In May 2016, Nélisse was present on the red carpet at Cannes Film Festival for the first time to present Canadian thriller movie Mean Dreams.

In 2016, Nélisse was one of four actors selected by the Toronto International Film Festival, alongside Grace Glowicki, Jared Abrahamson, and Mylène Mackay for its "Rising Stars" programme, described as an "intensive professional development programme [that] immerses participants in a series of public events and industry meetings during the Festival." In June 2018, it was announced that she would be the face of Caroline Néron's Fall 2018 jewelry line.

After graduating high school in June 2017, Nélisse confirmed she wouldn't be enrolling in post-secondary education for the time being due to commitments shooting Close in London and Morocco. In a L'actualité series about "Being 18 years old in 2018", Nélisse spoke about entering adulthood in the era of the Weinstein effect, and deplored that when she announced she was looking for "more mature roles", she was quickly offered multiple roles where her characters would be raped and that scenarios she receives almost always include sexual elements. One of these instances was when she turned down the sexually-charged lead role in Fugueuse, in which Ludivine Reding was eventually cast as Fanny, the titular teenage runaway who ends up a sex trafficking victim.

Personal life

Filmography

Film

Television

Awards and nominations

References

External links 

 

2000 births
Actresses from Montreal
Canadian child actresses
Canadian film actresses
Best Supporting Actress Genie and Canadian Screen Award winners
Living people
Canadian television actresses
Actresses from Windsor, Ontario
Franco-Ontarian people
21st-century Canadian actresses
Best Supporting Actress Jutra and Iris Award winners